The Togo national handball team is the national handball team of Togo.

African Championship record
1974 – 4th place
1976 – 4th place
1979 – 6th place
1994 – 7th place
1996 – 10th place

References

External links
IHF profile

Men's national handball teams
National sports teams of Togo